Goldman's pocket gopher, (Cratogeomys goldmani) is a species of rodent in the pocket gopher family. It is distributed throughout northern Mexico.

Subspecies
There are currently seven identified subspecies of Cratogeomys goldmani:
 C. g. elibatus
 C. g. goldmani
 C. g. maculats
 C. g. peridoneus
 C. g. planifrons
 C. g. rubellus
 C. g. subnubilus

References

Further reading

Cratogeomys
Mammals described in 1895
Taxa named by Clinton Hart Merriam